The Linde (Liinde) is a river in Sakha Republic, Russia. It is a left tributary of the Lena.

See also
List of rivers of Russia
Central Yakutian Lowland
Tukulan

References

External links 
 Geography - Yakutia Organized

Rivers of the Sakha Republic
Central Yakutian Lowland